Gregatin B is a metabolite of the fungi Cephalosporium gregatum and Aspergillus panamensis with the molecular formula C14H18O4 Gregatin B is a weak antibiotic.  Gregatin B was discovered on 1982.

References

Further reading 

 
 
 
 

Gregatin B
Antibiotics
Cyclopentenes
Methyl esters